Lesia is a feminine given name. Notable people with the name include:

Lesia Dychko (born 1939), Ukrainian music educator and composer
Lesia Liss (born 1966), American politician
Lesia Tsurenko (born 1989), Ukrainian tennis player
Lesia Valadzenkava (born 1991), Belarusian ice dancer
Lesia Vasylenko, Ukrainian lawyer and politician 

Other uses:
Lesia (plant), a genus of plants in the family Gesneriaceae

Feminine given names